Norway competed at the 1912 Summer Olympics in Stockholm, Sweden. 190 competitors, 188 men and 2 women, took part in 58 events in 14 sports.

Medalists

Gold
 Ferdinand Bie — Athletics, Men's Pentathlon
 Men's Team (free system) — Gymnastics
 Alfred Larsen, Johan Anker, Nils Bertelsen, Halfdan Hansen, Magnus Konow, Petter Larsen, Eilert Falch-Lund, Christian Staib, Arnfinn Heje and Carl Thaulow — Sailing, Men's 12m class
 Thoralf Glad, Thomas Aas, Andreas Brecke, Torleiv Corneliussen and Christian Jebe — Sailing, Men's 8m class

Silver
 Gudbrand Skatteboe, Ole Sæther, Østen Østensen, Albert Helgerud, Olaf Sæther and Einar Liberg — Shooting, Men's Team free rifle

Bronze
 Men's Team (Swedish system) — Gymnastics
 Claus Høyer, Reidar Holter, Max Herseth, Frithjof Olstad and Olaf Bjørnstad (cox) — Rowing, Men's coxed fours, inriggers
 Theodor Klem, Henry Larsen, Håkon Tønsager, Mathias Torstensen and Ejnar Tønsager (cox) — Rowing, Men's coxed fours
 Engebret Skogen — Shooting, Men's 300m military rifle, three positions
 Molla Bjurstedt — Tennis, Women's singles outdoor

Aquatics

Diving

Three divers, all men, represented Norway. It was Norway's debut in diving. None of the three divers reached the final in any of their events.

Rankings given are within the diver's heat.

Swimming

Five swimmers, including one woman, competed for Norway at the 1912 Games. It was the nation's debut in swimming. None of the Norwegian swimmers advanced to the finals, with Johnsen's sixth-place finish in his 400-metre freestyle semifinal the best result of the Games.

Ranks given for each swimmer are within the heat.

 Men

 Women

Athletics

23 athletes represented Norway. It was the nation's third appearance in the sport as well as the Olympics.

Ferdinand Bie, who had originally won the silver medal in the pentathlon, was awarded gold after Jim Thorpe was disqualified. When Thorpe was reinstated in 1982, Bie retained his gold medal in the event and became co-champions with Thorpe. Bie's medal was the only one won by Norway in 1912 and was the nation's first athletics gold medal. Arne Halse, who had previously held Norway's best athletics result with a silver medal in the 1908 javelin throw, placed 7th in the javelin and 5th in the two-handed version of the event. Norway also had two fourth-place finishes, in the triple jump and team cross country.

Ranks given are within that athlete's heat for running events.

Cycling

Six cyclists represented Norway. It was the first appearance of the nation in cycling. Birgir Andreasen had the best time in the time trial, the only race held, finishing 14th. Because only three Norwegian cyclists finished the time trial, the team received no ranking in the four-man team competition.

Road cycling

Equestrian

 Dressage

 Jumping

Fencing

Seven fencers represented Norway, including the only Norwegian fencer who had competed in 1908. It was the second appearance of the nation in fencing. None of the Norwegian fencers were able to advance past the quarterfinal round; however, advancement to quarterfinals was itself an improvement over the results of the previous Games.

Football

Quarterfinals

Consolation tournament

Gymnastics

Forty-six gymnasts represented Norway. It was the second appearance of the nation in gymnastics. Norway had no gymnasts in the individual competition, but had teams in two of the three team events. In the free system even, the Norwegian team took first place to earn the country's first gymnastics gold medal. The team finished third and last in the Swedish system, taking the bronze medal.

Artistic

Modern pentathlon 

Norway had two competitors in the first Olympic pentathlon competition. Paaske finished 13th among the 22 finishers, while Norby was among the ten pentathletes who did not finish.

(The scoring system was point-for-place in each of the five events, with the smallest point total winning.)

Rowing 

Twenty four rowers represented Norway. It was the nation's second appearance in rowing. The Norwegians took two bronze medals; it were Norway's first Olympic medals in rowing.

(Ranks given are within each crew's heat.)

Sailing 

 
Eighteen sailors represented Norway. It was the nation's second appearance in sailing. Each of the Norwegian boats found either great success or an utter lack thereof. Two of the three boats won each race in their respective classes to take gold medals without any need for race-offs; these two gold medals were the first medals of any sort Norwegian sailors had won. The third boat, on the other hand, placed fifth (of six) in both of its two races and did not score a single point.

(7 points for 1st in each race, 3 points for 2nd, 1 point for 3rd. Race-off to break ties in total points if necessary for medal standings.)

Shooting 

Twenty eight shooters competed for Norway. It was the third appearance of the nation in shooting, which Norway had contested each time the nation appeared at the Olympics. The Norwegian shooters won a pair of medals—a silver in the team free rifle and Skogen's bronze in the three positions military rifle. This was a comparatively disappointing result, as the Norwegians had taken a pair of gold medals and a bronze in 1908 and four total medals (though no golds) in 1900.

Tennis 

Seven tennis players, including one woman, represented Norway at the 1912 Games. It was the nation's debut in tennis. Despite a combined record of 1–10 by the Norwegian tennis players, Bjurstedt took a bronze medal after receiving byes through to the semifinals in the women's outdoor singles. Her win in the bronze medal match after being defeated in the semi gave Norway its first tennis medal.

 Men

 Women

 Mixed

Wrestling

Greco-Roman

Norway was represented by nine wrestlers in its second Olympic wrestling appearance. Lofthus's 11th-place finish was the best. The team went a combined 8–18.

References

External links

International Olympic Committee results database

Nations at the 1912 Summer Olympics
1912
Olympics